The St. Patrick's Day Snowstorm was a powerful winter storm that hit the Southeastern United States in mid-March 1892, with the heaviest snowfalls occurring in Nashville, Tennessee, and the Mid-State region. The event was atypical for this humid subtropical climate.

Average climate
The average snowfall is only  in the latter half of the month.

Winter of 1891–92
The winter of 1891–92 featured very little snowfall in Tennessee, only  recorded in Nashville through March 14. The temperature reached into the 60s during several days that March, and even into the 70s on March 4.

Much of the Southeastern United States plummeted into the teens from Arkansas to Alabama. On March 15, 1892, Nashville received  of snow, most of which melted by the following day.

Storm details
On March 16 around 6:00 pm, snow began falling in Nashville with little accumulating by midnight.

In Nashville, morning trains were delayed while streetcars were unable to function. A freight train traveling from Chattanooga to Nashville partially derailed when it collided with a train engine near Murfreesboro.

Outside of Middle Tennessee
Memphis received  of snow while Mount Carmel, Illinois, received . Even Atlanta, Georgia, received  of snow with accumulation measured as far south as Mobile, Alabama, and as far west as San Antonio, Texas. The surface storm moved along the Gulf Coast before dying out, only to regain power as it traveled up the Eastern Seaboard, dropping  of snow over the Mid-Atlantic and Northeastern United States.

Records established
Highest snowfall total in Nashville for a single day at 
Highest snowfall total in Nashville for a 24-hour period at 
Highest snowfall total in Memphis for a single day at 
Highest snowfall total in Memphis for a 24-hour period at 
Highest snowfall total in Middle Tennessee in one day at 
Highest snowfall total in Nashville for a single month at 

The St. Patrick's Day Snowstorm also ranks as the second-deepest snow in Nashville history, only topped by the 22.8-inch (57.9-cm) snow that fell over a 48-hour period in February 1886. Only two other snowfalls in Nashville have ever exceeded ; a 15-inch (38.1-cm) snow in February 1929 and a 10.2-inch (25.9-cm) snow that concluded on New Year's Day of 1964.

References

External links
 Maps of the snowfall

Blizzards in the United States
1892 meteorology
1892 natural disasters
1892 in the United States
Natural disasters in Tennessee
1892 natural disasters in the United States
March 1892 events
Saint Patrick's Day